Xuân Ninh may refer to several places in Vietnam, including:

 Xuân Ninh, Quảng Bình, a rural commune of Quảng Ninh District.
 , a rural commune of Xuân Trường District.